Jay William Hakkinen (born July 19, 1977) is a former biathlete. He is a four-time American Olympian, and his 10th-place finish in the 20-kilometer individual race at the 2006 Winter Olympics in Turin, Italy was the best finish ever by an American biathlete.

Hakkinen retired from the sport at the end of the 2013–14 season.

Background
At the age of three, Hakkinen learned how to skate. Soon after, he picked up cross-country skiing, where he won the Junior 5 km freestyle. He got involved in biathlon when in 1994, he went for a year to a Norwegian town in a student exchange program. His host parents were able to arrange for him to trade with a local biathlon club. Within three years of returning home to Alaska, he was the Junior World Champion of biathlon.

Performance in Turin
Hakkinen placed 10th in the 20-kilometer individual race at the 2006 Winter Olympics in Turin, Italy. He had the 2nd fastest skiing time of anyone in the competition, but failed to medal because of penalties he earned while shooting. He vowed to medal in his next event, but instead missed all five targets and fell quickly out of contention. Hakkinen was the lead biathlete for the United States in the relay, and was in first place when he handed off to his teammate; ultimately, however, the United States finished in 9th in the relay.

Biathlon results
All results are sourced from the International Biathlon Union.

Olympic Games

*Pursuit was added as an event in 2002, with mass start being added in 2006.

World Championships

*During Olympic seasons competitions are only held for those events not included in the Olympic program.
**Team was removed as an event in 1998, and mass start was added in 1999 with the mixed relay being added in 2005.

References

External links
 
 
 
 NBCOlympics.com – Athletes – Jay Hakkinen Bio
 Jay Hakkinen's U.S. Olympic Team bio
 

1977 births
Living people
American people of Finnish descent
Sportspeople from Alaska
American male biathletes
Biathletes at the 1998 Winter Olympics
Biathletes at the 2002 Winter Olympics
Biathletes at the 2006 Winter Olympics
Biathletes at the 2010 Winter Olympics
Olympic biathletes of the United States